Jawad khan (Pashto/Urdu: جواد خان; born 24 December 1989, Swabi District) is a Pakistani international baseball player who bowls left arm fast. He is the second player from Swabi to qualify for the Pakistan national baseball team.

References

Living people
1989 births
Pakistani baseball players